John Montagu, 4th Earl of Sandwich, PC, FRS (13 November 1718 – 30 April 1792) was a British statesman who succeeded his grandfather Edward Montagu, 3rd Earl of Sandwich as the Earl of Sandwich in 1729, at the age of ten. During his life, he held various military and political offices, including Postmaster General, First Lord of the Admiralty, and Secretary of State for the Northern Department. He is also known for the claim that he was the eponymous inventor of the sandwich.

Biography

Early years
John Montagu was born in 1718, the son of Edward Montagu, Viscount Hinchingbrooke. His father died when John was four, leaving him as his heir. His mother soon remarried and he had little further contact with her. He succeeded his grandfather as Earl of Sandwich in 1729, at the age of ten. He was educated at Eton and at Trinity College, Cambridge, and spent some time travelling, initially going on the Grand Tour around Continental Europe before visiting the more unusual destinations of Greece, Turkey, and Egypt which were then part of the Ottoman Empire. This led him later to found a number of Orientalist societies. On his return to England in 1739, he took his seat in the House of Lords as a follower of the Duke of Bedford, one of the wealthiest and most powerful politicians of the era. He became a Patriot Whig and one of the sharpest critics of the Walpole government, attacking the government's strategy in the War of the Austrian Succession. Like many Patriot Whigs, Lord Sandwich was opposed to Britain's support of Hanover and strongly opposed the deployment of British troops on the European Continent to protect it, instead arguing that Britain should make greater use of its naval power. He gained attention for his speeches in parliament. His oratory earned him a reputation for clearly setting out his argument even if he lacked natural eloquence.

Political career
In 1744, the Duke of Bedford was invited to join the government, now headed by Henry Pelham, taking the post of First Lord of the Admiralty. Sandwich joined him as one of the commissioners of the Admiralty, in effect serving as deputy under Bedford. The experienced Admiral Lord Anson also joined the Admiralty board and was an influential figure. Bedford spent much of his time at his country estate, and much of the day-to-day running of the Admiralty fell to Sandwich and Anson. Anson had control of the training and discipline of the navy, while Sandwich focused on the administration. Following a proposal by Admiral Edward Vernon, the concept of a Western Squadron was pioneered, which proved very successful. This marked a radical shift in British naval strategy, and led to British success at the Battles of Cape Finisterre.

The following year, Sandwich took a commission as a colonel in the British Army as part of the response to the Jacobite rising and the prospect of a French invasion. In order to boost the relatively small British army, a number of units were raised by prominent figures, and Sandwich served in the regiment formed by Bedford. While serving in The Midlands, he fell seriously ill with fever and nearly died. After his recovery, he returned to his duties at the admiralty. He remained an army officer for the rest of his life, remaining on the half-pay list and eventually rising to the rank of general, even though he took no further active part in the army.

Congress of Breda
In 1746 he was sent as a plenipotentiary to the Congress of Breda, and he continued to take part in the negotiations for peace until the Treaty of Aix-la-Chapelle was concluded in 1748. Sandwich was also made ambassador to the Dutch Republic during the talks. Using the resources of the British secret service, Sandwich was able to outmanoeuvre his French counterpart by intercepting the latter's secret correspondence. His service at Breda drew him to the attention of the influential Thomas Pelham-Holles, 1st Duke of Newcastle, who lobbied for him to be given high office when he returned home.

It is possible that during his time at Breda, he played a role in the 1747 Dutch Revolution which brought William IV, Prince of Orange wider powers, something supported by Britain as they hoped the Prince would improve the Dutch Republic's military performance in the ongoing war in the Low Countries. However, there is no firm evidence of this.

First Lord of the Admiralty (first and second spells)

In February 1748 he became First Lord of the Admiralty, retaining this post until June 1751. By 1751 Newcastle, who had previously admired Sandwich for his forthright and hardline views, had increasingly begun to distrust him and his relationship with The Duke of Bedford whom Newcastle regarded as a rival. Newcastle engineered the dismissal of both of them, by sacking Sandwich. Bedford resigned in protest, as Newcastle had calculated, allowing him to replace them with men he considered more loyal personally to him.

For the next few years Sandwich spent time at his country estate, largely avoiding politics, though he kept in close contact with both Bedford and Anson and Britain's participation in the Seven Years' War. Partly thanks to naval reforms pioneered by Anson and Sandwich, the Royal Navy enjoyed a series of successes and was able to blockade much of the French fleet in port.

In 1763 he returned to the Admiralty in the government of John Stuart, 3rd Earl of Bute, and encouraged a major rebuilding programme for the Royal Navy. Bute was a Tory who wished to bring the war to an end, which he did with the Treaty of Paris. It was during this time that Sandwich first met Martha Ray who became his long-standing mistress. He was soon dismissed from the office, but was offered the influential position of Ambassador to Madrid.

Northern Secretary
In August 1763 Sandwich became Secretary of State for the Northern Department, in the government of George Grenville who had replaced Bute. While filling this office he took a leading part in the successful prosecution of the radical MP John Wilkes for obscene libel. Although he had been allegedly associated with Wilkes in the notorious Hellfire Club (also known as the Monks of Medmenham), recent scholarship has suggested that the two had a more distant but cordial relationship than the friendship which was popularly portrayed at the time. John Gay's The Beggar's Opera was played in Covent Garden shortly thereafter, and the similarity of Sandwich's conduct to that of Jemmy Twitcher, betrayer of Macheath in that play, permanently attached to him that appellation. Wilkes was eventually expelled from the House of Commons.

He held the post of Northern Secretary until July 1765. His departure from the post coincided with the end of George Grenville's term as prime minister. He hoped to return to office swiftly, provided a united opposition could be formed.

Sandwich was postmaster general from 1768 to 1771 and briefly secretary of state again from December 1770 to January 1771.

First Lord of the Admiralty (third spell)

Sandwich served again as First Lord of the Admiralty in Lord North's administration from 1771 to 1782. He replaced the distinguished Admiral Sir Edward Hawke in the post. His appointment to the post followed the Falklands Crisis which had nearly seen Britain go to war with Spain over the Falkland Islands in the South Atlantic Ocean after the Capture of Port Egmont by Spanish forces. War had only been averted when Louis XVI of France refused to back the Spanish over the dispute. Both France and Spain resented what they considered British hegemony following the Seven Years' War, and desired to overturn the imbalance of power; war was widely expected to break out between the nations in the near future.

In 1774, only three years into his third term, Sandwich commissioned a series of ship models and a model of Chatham Dockyard as a gift to George III in an attempt to interest his king in naval matters. However, Sandwich's overall administration of the navy in the lead up to and during the American War of Independence was traditionally portrayed as being incompetent, with insufficient ships being ready for the outbreak of war with France in 1778. In 1775, Sandwich spoke vociferously in opposition to a plan for British America put forth by Benjamin Franklin and the Earl of Chatham. When Britain and France went to war, Sandwich advocated a strategy of concentrating the British fleet in European waters to deter invasion in opposition to his colleague, Lord Germain, who pushed for more ships to be sent to North America. The cabinet largely followed Sandwich's policy, retaining footholds on the American coast which could be used as naval bases, while retaining the bulk of the fleet at home. Sandwich's problems increased when Spain entered the war on France's side in 1779 giving the Bourbon fleets a numerical advantage over the Royal Navy.

Prior to 1778 Keppel failed to persuade Sandwich to ignore technical difficulties and "copper sheath only a few ships"; he was later possibly unfairly to make political capital out of this in The London Magazine, March 1781. He had remarked that coppering "gave additional strength to the navy" and he reproached Lord Sandwich with having "refused to sheath only a few ships with copper" at his request, when he had since ordered the whole navy to be sheathed. The lack of coppering the navy was one of the key reasons leading to Britain losing the Thirteen Colonies.

In 1778 the new Navy Board Controller Charles Middleton, who had the major problem at the time with supplying over 100 ships for the American Revolutionary War (1775–1783), compounded that year by French opportunism in declaring war on Britain to support the American rebels, effectively turned what was a local civil war into a global conflict. Others followed: Spain in 1779 and the Netherlands in 1780. Middleton took the view that Britain was "outnumbered at every station", and the navy was required to "extricate us from present danger". He understood that coppering allowed the navy to stay at sea for much longer without the need for cleaning and repairs to the underwater hull, making it a very attractive, if expensive, proposition. On 21 January 1779 he wrote to the Admiralty, and petitioned King George directly. The King backed him for what was an expensive process for an untested technology, and in May 1779 he placed orders at the Portsmouth Docks for coppering a total 51 ships within a year.

During 1779 a combined Franco-Spanish fleet was able to sail into the English Channel to threaten the coast of Cornwall in the initial stage of a Franco-Spanish invasion of Britain. Sandwich was criticised for the failure of the smaller British Channel Fleet to prevent this, although the invasion never materialised.

After 1778, the primary objective in the war was maintaining control over the sugar-rich West Indian archipelago The lucrative sugar trade in the Caribbean was reckoned at the time as being of more importance to British interests than the 13 colonies. The sugar trade was paying for the costs of the American Revolutionary War (1775–1783) and the Anglo-French War (1778–1783). The Royal Navy's newly coppered ships as yet untested were used successfully by Rodney in defeating the French at the Battle of the Saintes off Dominica in February 1782.

By the time Sandwich's administration ended, he would take full credit for coppering the fleet as one of his great achievements when defending his record in office in January 1782.

Personal life

For several years Sandwich had as a mistress Fanny Murray, the subject of John Wilkes' An Essay on Woman (1763), but he eventually married Dorothy Fane, daughter of the 1st Viscount Fane, by whom he had a son, John, Viscount Hinchingbrooke (1743–1814), who later succeeded as 5th Earl. Sandwich's first personal tragedy was his wife's deteriorating health and eventual insanity. During his wife's decline, Sandwich started an affair with a singer named Martha Ray. During their relationship, Ray bore him at least five, and perhaps as many as nine, children, including Basil Montagu (1770–1851), writer, jurist and philanthropist. According to several sources, Sandwich was unable to provide adequately and permanently for his mistress and their children; she therefore encouraged the suit of Captain James Hackman, who later exchanged the army for the clergy. In April 1779, Ray was killed  in the foyer of the Royal Opera House (Covent Garden) at the hands of Hackman, Rector of Wiveton.

Sandwich never recovered from his grief. The events surrounding Ray's murder were depicted in the popular novel Love and Madness (1780) by Herbert Croft.

In a famous exchange with the actor Samuel Foote, Sandwich declared, "Foote, I have often wondered what catastrophe would bring you to your end; but I think, that you must either die of the pox, or the halter." "My lord", replied Foote instantaneously, "that will depend upon one of two contingencies; – whether I embrace your lordship's mistress, or your lordship's principles." This retort is often misattributed to John Wilkes.

Sandwich retired from public duty in 1782, and lived another ten years in retirement at what was then the family seat, Hinchingbrooke House, Huntingdonshire, dying on 30 April 1792. His title of Earl of Sandwich passed to his eldest son, John Montagu, 5th Earl of Sandwich, who was 48 years old at the time.

Sandwich was buried in All Saints' Church in Barnwell, Northamptonshire, of which only the chancel survives, kept to preserve the Montagu tombs.

Legacy
Sandwich retired in 1782. Despite holding a number of important posts during his career, Sandwich's incompetence and corruption were legendary, inspiring the saying: "Seldom has any man held so many offices and accomplished so little."

Recently, some historians have begun to suggest that Lord Sandwich was not perhaps as incompetent as suggested, but that previous historians have placed too much emphasis on sources from his political enemies.

The sandwich
The modern sandwich is named after Lord Sandwich, but the exact circumstances of its invention and original use are still the subject of debate. A rumour in a contemporaneous travel book called Tour to London by Pierre-Jean Grosley formed the popular myth that bread and meat sustained Lord Sandwich at the gambling table but Sandwich had many bad habits, including the Hellfire Club, and any story may be a creation after the fact. Lord Sandwich was a very conversant gambler, the story goes, and he did not take the time to have a meal during his long hours playing at the card table. Consequently, he would ask his servants to bring him slices of meat between two slices of bread, a habit well known among his gambling friends. Other people, according to this account, began to order "the same as Sandwich!", and thus the "sandwich" was born. The sober alternative to this account is provided by Sandwich's biographer N. A. M. Rodger, who suggests that Sandwich's commitments to the navy, to politics, and to the arts mean that the first sandwich was more likely to have been consumed at his work desk.

Islands named after Sandwich by Capt. James Cook

Lord Sandwich was a great supporter of Captain James Cook. As First Lord of the Admiralty, Sandwich approved Admiralty funds for the purchase and fit-out of the Resolution, Adventure and Discovery for Cook's second and third expeditions of exploration in the Pacific Ocean. He also arranged an audience with the King, which was an unusual privilege for a lower ranking officer. In honour of Sandwich, Cook named the Sandwich Islands (Hawaii) after him, as well as Montague Island off the south east coast of Australia, the South Sandwich Islands in the Southern Atlantic Ocean and Montague Island in the Gulf of Alaska. Hinchinbrook Island was named for the House owned by the Montagu family. Lord Sandwich donated the various items given him by Cook to Trinity College at the University of Cambridge. He also met the young Ra'iatean Omai, whom Cook had brought to Europe, and took him to his country estate for a week, presenting him with a suit of armour.

Cricket
Like his friends John Russell, 4th Duke of Bedford and George Montagu-Dunk, 2nd Earl of Halifax, Sandwich was keen on cricket. The earliest surviving record of his involvement in the sport comes from 1741 when, as the patron and captain of the Huntingdonshire county team, Sandwich and Halifax formed the Northamptonshire & Huntingdonshire team which twice defeated Bedfordshire, first at Woburn Park and then at Cow Meadow, Northampton.

Music
After his naval career, Sandwich turned his energy toward music. He became a great proponent of "ancient music" (defined by him as music more than two decades old). He was the patron of the Italian violinist Felice Giardini, and created a "Catch Club", where professional singers would sing "ancient" and modern catches, glees, and madrigals. He also put on performances of George Frideric Handel's oratorios, masques, and odes at his estate. Sandwich was instrumental in putting together the Concert of Ancient Music, the first public concert to showcase a canonic repertory of old works.

Chronology
1718: The 4th Earl of Sandwich is born on 13 November 1718
1729: Succeeds his grandfather, Edward Montague, 3rd Earl of Sandwich, in the earldom
1729: Educated at Eton and Trinity College, Cambridge
1740/41 (old style/new style), 14 March: marries The Hon. Dorothy Fane at St James's, Westminster
1746: Sent as plenipotentiary to the congress at Breda, and continues to take part in the negotiations for peace until the Treaty of Aix-la-Chapelle is signed in 1748
1748–1751: First term as First Lord of the Admiralty
1749–1756: Bailiff of the Bedford Level Corporation
1763: Becomes one of the principal secretaries of state
1763: Second term as First Lord of the Admiralty
1768: Appointed Postmaster General
1770: Becomes Secretary of State
1771–1782: Third and last term as First Lord of the Admiralty (during this term: the American Revolutionary War, 1775–1783)
1779: His mistress Martha Ray, mother of five of his children, murdered by her admirer James Hackman in Covent Garden
1782: Retires in March
1792: Dies on 30 April

In literature and popular media 
A plate of Sir Peter Lely's 1666 portrait of the 1st Earl appeared in Fisher's Drawing Room Scrap Book, 1837, together with a facsimile signature and a poetical illustration  by Letitia Elizabeth Landon, which actually relates to the 4th Earl (the islands being so-called in his honour).

Actor Bill Nighy was cast as Lord Sandwich in the TV series, Longitude in 2000.

See also 
 Secretary of State (England)
 Secretary of State for the Northern Department
 List of the First Lords of the Admiralty
 Postmaster General of the United Kingdom

References

Bibliography

External links

Guide to the papers of Lord Sandwich, 1718–1792 held and digitised by the National Library of Australia
Smithsonian Magazine article on the Earl's Love Triangle
The Lives & Times of the Hell-Fire Club

1718 births
1792 deaths
Alumni of Trinity College, Cambridge
Ambassadors of Great Britain to the Netherlands
British Army generals
British officials in the American Revolution
English cricketers of 1701 to 1786
English cricketers
Montagu, John
Fellows of the Royal Society
Lords of the Admiralty
Members of the Privy Council of Great Britain
John Montagu, 04th Earl of Sandwich
People educated at Eton College
Secretaries of State for the Northern Department
United Kingdom Postmasters General
Cricket patrons
Earls of Sandwich
18th-century philanthropists